Parcani is a commune in Soroca District, Moldova. It is composed of two villages, Parcani and Voloave.

References

Communes of Soroca District